Players at the Game of People is a science fiction novel by John Brunner. It was first published in the United States by Nelson Doubleday in 1980.

External links 
 

1980 British novels
1980 science fiction novels
Novels by John Brunner
Doubleday (publisher) books